Zaccai Curtis (born December 25, 1981) is a pianist and composer.

Curtis studied at Jackie McLean's Artists Collective school in Hartford, Connecticut. Curtis founded Truth Revolution, a record label that he refers to as "Truth Revolution Recording Collective, a working community of artists". The label issued Andy González's Entre Colegas, which was nominated for a 2017 Grammy Award.

Curtis and his brother, bassist Luques, are part of The Curtis Brothers Band (not to be confused with Michael and Richard Curtis, who also recorded as The Curtis Brothers). Their music is strongly influenced by Art Blakey and The Jazz Messengers. 

The Curtis Brothers Band's first album, Blood, Spirit, Land, Water, Freedom, was followed around 2012 by Completion of Proof. Their album Algorithm, released around 2019, featured trumpeter Brian Lynch, alto saxophonist Donald Harrison, and drummer Ralph Peterson. Zaccai wrote all of the compositions that appear on the recording.

Curtis is also faculty at the University of Rhode Island and the Jackie McLaean Institute at the HARTT School in Hartford Connecticut.

Discography
 Insight (2000)
 Blood, Spirit, Land, Water, Freedom (2010)
 Completion of Proof (2012)
 Nuestro Tango (2013)
 Algorithm

References

External links
 
 Truth Revolution Recording Collective

1981 births
Living people
Latin jazz musicians
American people of Puerto Rican descent
American bandleaders
Musicians from New York City
New England Conservatory alumni